Orges Naser Bunjaku (born 5 July 2001) is a professional footballer who plays as a midfielder for Schaffhausen on loan from French club Grenoble. Born in Switzerland, he represented that nation at youth international levels but in 2022 elected to play for Kosovo.

Club career

Early career and Basel
Bunjaku at the age of six started playing football in local club Rapperswil-Jona. In 2015, he transferred to the youth system of Basel. In January 2020, he advanced to their first team and signed his first professional contract with the club, agreeing on a four-year deal.

After playing in two test games, Bunjaku played his domestic league debut for the club in the away game on 8 February 2020 as Basel won 4–0 against Zürich. He played five league games in his first season, three times he played in the starting formation. He also had one appearance in the UEFA Europa League as he was substituted in during 84th minute in the match against APOEL.

Grenoble
On 19 July 2021, Bunjaku signed a three-year contract with Ligue 2 club Grenoble and received squad number 25. Five days later, he made his debut in a 0–4 home defeat against Paris FC after coming on as a substitute at 46th minute in place of Yannick Marchand.

Loan at Schaffhausen
On 2 January 2023, Bunjaku signed for Swiss Challenge League club Schaffhausen on loan until the end of the season.

International career

Youth
From 2016, until 2020, Bunjaku has been part of Switzerland at youth international level, respectively has been part of the U15, U16, U17, U18, U19 and U20 teams and he with these teams played twenty matches and scored four goals.

Senior
Bunjaku's agent, Christoph Graf through an interview stated that Bunjaku has started the procedures for obtaining Kosovan passport and his wish is to play for Kosovo national team. On 22 March 2022, the Football Federation of Kosovo announced that Bunjaku had decided to represent their national team.

References

External links

2001 births
Sportspeople from the canton of St. Gallen
Swiss people of Kosovan descent
Swiss people of Albanian descent
Living people
Kosovan footballers

Swiss men's footballers
Switzerland youth international footballers
Association football midfielders
FC Basel players
Grenoble Foot 38 players
FC Schaffhausen players
Swiss Promotion League players
Swiss Super League players
Ligue 2 players
Swiss Challenge League players
Swiss expatriate footballers
Expatriate footballers in France
Swiss expatriate sportspeople in France
Kosovan expatriate footballers
Kosovan expatriate sportspeople in France